Ursula of Rosenfeld ( – 26 February 1538) was the second wife of Margrave Ernest of Baden-Durlach.  All grand dukes of Baden descend from her, via her son Charles II.

Life 
Ursula was born  as the youngest child of Wolf of Rosenfeld (d. 1500) and his wife Anna Bombast of Hohenheim.  They were considered lower nobility.  Her father was Schultheiß of the town of Rosenfeld in Württemberg.  According to legend, the family lived in the stately "Ursula house", which dates to the early 15th century.

Ursula was a lady-in-waiting of Margravine Elisabeth of Brandenburg-Ansbach-Kulmbach, the first wife of Margrave Ernest of Baden-Durlach.  Elisabeth died on 31 May 1518.  Soon afterwards, probably later in 1518, Ernest married Ursula.  Although she was lower nobility, their marriage was not considered morganatic, because she became a Margravine by marriage.  On her tomb stone, she is referred to as "the illustrious Lady Ursula, Margravine of Baden and Hochberg, wife of the illustrious Prince Lord Ernest, Margrave of Baden and Hochberg" (ILL. DNA VRSV=LA MARCHIONISSA / BADEN ET HOCHBERG ILLVSTRIS PRINCIPIS / DNI ERNESTI MARCHIONIS IN BADEN ET HOCHBERG CONIUNX).

Ursula died on 26 February 1538 and was buried in the castle church in Pforzheim.  Ernest constructed a double tomb stone in the form of a sarcophagus in her honor in the choir of the castle church.

Issue 
According to the chronicle, Ernest and Ursula had "many children".  Accurate lists of their children have not survived.  Three children are known to be hers:
 Margaret (1519-1571), married on 12 November 1538 Count Wolfgang II of Oettingen (1511-1572)
 Salome (d. 1549), married in 1540 to Count Ladislaus of Fraunberg-Haag (1505-1566) 
 Charles II (24 July 1529 – 23 March 1577), Margrave of Baden-Durlach

Footnotes

References 
 Casimir Bumiller: Ursula von Rosenfeld und die Tragödie des Hauses Baden, Gernsbach, 2010, 
 Pütter: Ueber Mißheirathen Teutscher Fürsten und Grafen, Göttingen, 1796, p. 83-91
 Christoph Meiners and Ludwig Timotheus Spittler (eds.): Mark-Graf Ernst von Baden und Ursula von Rosenfeld, die Stamm-Eltern des noch blühenden Badischen Hauses, in: Göttingisches Historisches Magazin, vol. 4, Hannover 1789, p. 737-772

External links 
 Photo of Ursula's grave at: Image Archive Photo Marburg — Index of images of Art and Architecture

Margravines of Baden
Year of birth uncertain
1490s births
1538 deaths
16th-century German people